Mighty Servant 3 is a 27,000-ton semi-submersible heavy lift ship. The vessel was built in 1984 by Oshima Shipbuilding Co. Ltd. in Ōshima, Japan, for Dutch shipping firm Wijsmuller Transport, which merged in 1993 with Dock Express Shipping to become Breda-based offshore heavy lifting group Dockwise Shipping B.V.

Service
Most of the cargo transported by Mighty Servant 3 are oil platforms and drilling industry related gear.  When loading its mammoth burdens, it takes on thousands of gallons of water into ballast tanks, which causes the cargo deck to submerge. After the cargo is floated into position, the ballast tanks are emptied with pumps, slowly lifting the deck above the waterline to sailing position.

In 2010, Mighty Servant 3 was outfitted with oil skimming equipment and used in the cleanup of the Deepwater Horizon oil spill in the Gulf of Mexico.

Incidents and accidents

2006 sinking 
During submerging to unload cargo, the ship developed a list and continued to submerge beyond design limits. There were no casualties, nor damage to the transported platform.

After five months of resting on the seabed, it was salvaged by Dutch salvage-company Smit International and handed back to its owners on 26 May 2007. To pull the vessel from the seabed, the 1,200 tonne sheerleg Taklift 7 was used in combination with pumping pressurized air into the closed compartments of Mighty Servant 3.  It was transported to Grand Bahama Shipyard for repairs, arriving on 17 June 2007. In August 2009, after an extensive rebuild of its engines, in Zwolle by Wärtsilä, she was returned to service.

See also
Mighty Servant 1
Mighty Servant 2

References

External links
Dockwise Shipping B.V.
Smit International press release about salvage of Mighty Servant 3
2006 photo of Mighty Servant 3 sinking after accident

1984 ships
Semi-submersibles
Heavy lift ships
Ships of the Netherlands
Ships built by Oshima Shipbuilding
Maritime incidents in 2006